Henry Creasey (1864 – 15 March 1923) was a British sport shooter. He was born in Leicester. Competing for Great Britain, he won a bronze medal in team trap shooting at the 1908 Summer Olympics in London.

References

External links
 

1864 births
1923 deaths
Sportspeople from Leicester
British male sport shooters
Olympic shooters of Great Britain
Olympic bronze medallists for Great Britain
Shooters at the 1908 Summer Olympics
Medalists at the 1908 Summer Olympics
Olympic medalists in shooting
20th-century British people